Gilford is a town in Belknap County, New Hampshire, United States. The population was 7,699 at the 2020 census, up from 7,126 at the 2010 census. Situated on Lake Winnipesaukee, Gilford is home to Governors Island, Ellacoya State Beach, Belknap Mountain State Forest, Gunstock Mountain Resort, and the Bank of New Hampshire Pavilion, a seasonal outdoor concert venue. The lakeside village of Glendale lies within Gilford's borders.

History
Settled in 1778 and originally a part of Gilmanton, the town was first called Gunstock Parish. In 1812, Captain Lemuel B. Mason, who had fought in the 1781 Battle of Guilford Court House in North Carolina during the Revolutionary War and subsequently retired to Gunstock Parish, successfully proposed incorporation of a new town to be named Guilford after that battle. The name would later be contracted by clerical error. The original parish name is used by Gunstock Mountain and the ski resort located on it.

Geography
Much of the town is drained by the Gunstock River, a tributary of Lake Winnipesaukee. Gilford lies fully within the Merrimack River watershed.

New Hampshire Route 11 crosses the town from east to west, connecting Alton and Rochester to the east with Laconia to the west. NH 11 joins U.S. Route 3 near the western border of Gilford, and together they turn south on the Laconia Bypass, which is largely within the Gilford town limits, traveling southwest towards Tilton and Franklin. New Hampshire Route 11A is an alternate east–west route to NH 11, passing through the center of Gilford and by the entrance to Gunstock Mountain Resort. New Hampshire Route 11B leaves NH 11 near Sanders Bay on Lake Winnipesaukee and proceeds northwest to Weirs Beach in Laconia.

Adjacent municipalities 
Moultonborough (north)
Alton (east)
Gilmanton (southeast)
Belmont (south)
Laconia (west)
Meredith (northeast)

Demographics

As of the census of 2000, there were 6,803 people, 2,766 households, and 2,019 families residing in the town. The population density was 174.6 people per square mile (67.4/km2). There were 4,312 housing units at an average density of 110.6 per square mile (42.7/km2). The racial makeup of the town was 98.32% White, 0.19% African American, 0.15% Native American, 0.51% Asian, 0.07% from other races, and 0.75% from two or more races. Hispanic or Latino of any race were 0.57% of the population.

There were 2,766 households, out of which 30.8% had children under the age of 18 living with them, 61.9% were married couples living together, 8.1% had a female householder with no husband present, and 27.0% were non-families. 21.7% of all households were made up of individuals, and 9.0% had someone living alone who was 65 years of age or older. The average household size was 2.46 and the average family size was 2.85.

In the town, the population was spread out, with 23.7% under the age of 18, 4.4% from 18 to 24, 25.4% from 25 to 44, 29.6% from 45 to 64, and 16.8% who were 65 years of age or older. The median age was 43 years. For every 100 females, there were 92.0 males. For every 100 females age 18 and over, there were 89.8 males.

The median income for a household in the town was $48,658, and the median income for a family was $56,554. Males had a median income of $38,839 versus $27,325 for females. The per capita income for the town was $32,667. About 2.2% of families and 3.3% of the population were below the poverty line, including 1.2% of those under age 18 and 2.7% of those age 65 or over.

Government

In the New Hampshire Senate, Gilford is in the 7th district, represented by Republican Harold F. French. On the New Hampshire Executive Council, Gilford is in the 1st district, represented by Republican Joseph Kenney. In the United States House of Representatives, Gilford is in New Hampshire's 1st congressional district, represented by Democrat Chris Pappas.

Sites of interest

 Bank of New Hampshire Pavilion
 John J. Morrill General Store (1857)
 Benjamin Rowe House
 Union Meetinghouse (1834)
 Gunstock Mountain Resort
 Lake Winnipesaukee Sailing Association
 Kimball Castle

Notable people 

 Glenn Cooper (born 1953), internationally best-selling author, film producer
 Stilson Hutchins (1838–1912), newspaper reporter, publisher (The Washington Post)
 Megan Lyman (born 1991), 2012 Miss New Hampshire
 Penny Pitou (born 1938), first U.S. woman to win an Olympic medal in downhill skiing
 Chris Sheridan (born 1967), writer and television producer (Family Guy)

References

External links

 
 Gilford Public Library
 Gilford Police Department
 Thompson-Ames Historical Society
 Kimball Castle
 Varney Point Gilford NH Weather and Webcam view
 New Hampshire Economic and Labor Market Information Bureau Profile

 
Towns in Belknap County, New Hampshire
Towns in New Hampshire
Populated places on Lake Winnipesaukee